Bai He (born 19 November 1983) is a former Chinese-born Hong Kong professional footballer who played as a defensive midfielder.

Career statistics in Hong Kong
As of 11 May 2013

International career
He is selected by Hong Kong national football team for 2010 East Asian Football Championship semi-final while South China represent Hong Kong in the competition.

As of 19 November 2013

Honours

Club
South China
 Hong Kong First Division: 2006–07, 2007–08, 2008–09, 2009–10
 Hong Kong FA Cup: 2010–11
 Hong Kong League Cup: 2010–11

Eastern
 Hong Kong Premier League: 2015–16
 Hong Kong Senior Shield: 2015–16

External links
 
 Bai He at HKFA

1983 births
Living people
Sportspeople from Baoding
Chinese footballers
Hong Kong footballers
Footballers from Hebei
Chengdu Tiancheng F.C. players
South China AA players
TSW Pegasus FC players
Cangzhou Mighty Lions F.C. players
Eastern Sports Club footballers
R&F (Hong Kong) players
Chinese Super League players
China League One players
Hong Kong Premier League players
Hong Kong international footballers
Association football midfielders
Hong Kong expatriate footballers